Christmas with You is the tenth studio album by American country music singer Clint Black. It is a reissue of his first Christmas album, 1995's Looking for Christmas, with two newly recorded songs, "Christmas with You" and "Santa's Holiday Song".

Track listing 
All songs written by Clint Black/Hayden Nicholas except where noted.

Personnel
Sam Bacco - percussion
Eddie Bayers - drums
Clint Black - harmonica, lead vocals, background vocals
Lily Pearl Black - spoken word
Robbie Buchanan - keyboards, piano
Lenny Castro - percussion
Jerry Douglas - dobro
Stuart Duncan - fiddle
Pat Enright - acoustic guitar
Dick Gay - drums
Wes Hightower - background vocals
Warren Hill - saxophone
Dann Huff - electric guitar
Ronn Huff - string arrangements, conductor
Jeff Huskins - fiddle
Wendell Kelley - trombone
Abraham Laboriel - bass guitar
Sam Levine - recorder
Gene Libbea - bass fiddle
The London Session Orchestra - strings
Hayden Nicholas - acoustic guitar
Alan O'Bryant - banjo
Dean Parks - acoustic guitar
Jeff Peterson - pedal steel guitar
Thomas R. Peterson - clarinet, saxophone
Tom Roady - percussion
John Robinson - drums
Ray Rogers - tenor banjo
Matt Rollings - piano
Leland Sklar - bass guitar
Fred Tackett - acoustic guitar
Russell Terrell - background vocals
Lee Thornburg - trumpet
George Tidewell - flugelhorn
Cindy Richardson Walker - background vocals
Roland White - mandolin
Jake Willemain - bass guitar
Gavyn Wright - string contractor
Curtis Young - background vocals

Chart performance

Album

Singles

References 
Black Tracks: Christmas with You. ClintBlack.com. Retrieved on November 7, 2007.
[ Artist Chart History (Singles)]. Billboard. Retrieved on November 7, 2007.
[ Artist Chart History (Albums)]. Billboard. Retrieved on November 7, 2007.

2004 Christmas albums
Christmas albums by American artists
Country Christmas albums
Albums produced by James Stroud
Clint Black albums
Equity Music Group albums
Reissue albums
Albums produced by Clint Black